Pittsburg is a city in Contra Costa County, California, United States. It is an industrial suburb located on the southern shore of the Suisun Bay in the East Bay region of the San Francisco Bay Area, and is part of the Sacramento–San Joaquin River Delta area.  The population was 76,416 at the 2020 United States Census.

History
Originally settled in 1839 as “Rancho Los Medanos”, the area of almost 10,000 acres was issued to Californios Jose Antonio Mesa and his brother Jose Miguel under a Mexican Land Grant by then Governor Juan Bautista Alvarado, one of the final land grants issued prior to the formation of California as a state.

In 1849, during the California Gold Rush, Colonel Jonathan D. Stevenson (from New York) bought the Rancho Los Medanos land grant for speculation, and laid out a town he called New York of the Pacific. General William Tecumseh Sherman laid out the first network of streets on the west side of town. The area was the midway stopping point for schooners traveling from San Francisco to the gold country further inland. Fishing, farming, and cattle raising for the hide and tallow industry were the major economic activities during this time.

In 1859, with the discovery of coal in the nearby town of Nortonville, the place became a port for coal. The Black Diamond Coal Mining Company commenced operations, building the Black Diamond Coal Mining Railroad to Nortonville. Steam powered engines moved coal cars down the tracks along present day Railroad Avenue to the waterfront docks that came to be called "Black Diamond Landing." The boom ended in 1885, and the company moved to Washington state to work a new claim.

In the 1870s, commercial fishing took hold and the Black Diamond Cannery was established at the foot of Los Medanos St. By 1882, a network of ten canneries was formed along the Sacramento Delta. An industry was born with fishermen, packing plants, boat builders and the like dominating the local waterfront for the next 80 years. The town boasted the largest Delta fishing community in the state, made up primarily of Sicilian immigrants, the families of which have remained in the area for generations. In 1957, the State of California closed down the Sacramento Delta to commercial fishing, ending the area's industry.

In 1900, C.A. Hooper purchased the land grant and gave birth to many manufacturing ventures, beginning in 1903 with the creation of the Industrial Center of the West. Hooper secured additional capitalization and provided property for Columbia Geneva Steel, which, in 1910, opened its California steel plant in Pittsburg with one foundry and a crew of 60 employees. It made steel castings for the dredging, lumber and shipping industries.

In 1903 the town was incorporated, and by a vote of the citizenry, was renamed "Black Diamond", after the mining firm. Because of the industrial potential of the site, a name change to Pittsburg was proposed in 1909. On February 11, 1911, the city officials changed the town’s name to "Pittsburg", honoring Pittsburgh, Pennsylvania, as the two cities shared a common steel and mining industrial heritage. This rechristening came at a time when the name of Pittsburgh, Pennsylvania was more commonly spelled without the "h".

In 1930, Columbia Steel became a subsidiary of U.S. Steel Company. The plant continued to grow until the early 1950s, reaching a peak staff of 5,200 employees when the markets for its products crashed. The parent company (by 1986, renamed as USS Company) had merged with Korean Pohang Iron and Steel Company. Together they invested $450 million turning the Pittsburg plant into a modern flat-products mill, renamed as USS-Posco. As of 1999, the facility employed 970 workers and shipped over 1.6 million U.S. tons per year of steel to over 175 customers in the Western U. S., Mexico, Canada and the Pacific Rim.

The original town site fronts on the Sacramento/San Joaquin River Delta, reflecting its origins as a deep water channel river port. (As of January 1, 2007, state legislation [Assembly Bill 2324] enabled the city to manage its own riverfront for commercial development and subsequent port operations). Since the early 1900s, the city has grown inland to the south, then spread east and west along State Route 4, now a freeway carrying resident commuters to jobs in the San Francisco Bay-Oakland Region. In the process, the former town of Cornwall, California was absorbed. As of the 2000 census, the city had a total population of 56,769.

Camp Stoneman was built in 1942, and was a major staging area for the United States Army during World War II and the Korean War until 1954.

The post office first opened in 1868 as Black Diamond, and changed its name with the town's in 1911.

Economy
The city has an extensive history of coal mining and industrial development since the late 1800s, with USS-POSCO Industries (a joint venture between US Steel and POSCO of South Korea) and Corteva (formerly, the Dow Chemical Company) maintaining substantial plants in Pittsburg.

Top employers
According to the City's 2020 Comprehensive Annual Financial Report, the top employers in the city are:

Bombardier Rail Car Facility 
On June 15, 2019, the East Bay Times reported that the Canadian company, Bombardier, Inc. is moving into a former warehouse in Pittsburg, where it will produce train cars destined for its Pacific Coast customers. Early in 2019, the Bay Area Rapid Transit (BART) System announced that it will replace its existing fleet of 669 cars with 775 cars of a new design, and has recently been negotiating to buy an additional 425 cars.

Bombardier plans to inaugurate the Pittsburg facility in September, 2019, with an initial workforce of 50, working on cars for the new BART contract, and growing to about 150 within five years.

Bombardier is one of the most active suppliers of train cars, and officials believe that the Pittsburg will substantially improve its competitive position. In the U.S., much of the funding for this equipment is supplied by the Federal Government, which requires that a large part of the work be performed in the U.S. Bombardier's only U.S. production facility is in Plattsburgh, N. Y.

The company also has a number of other important West Coast contracts, including:
 Maintain the Air Train System at San Francisco International Airport (SFO);
 supply the rail fleet for the Los Angeles Metrolink System;
 supply Coast and Sprinter train cars for San Diego's North County Transit District;
 initial design for automated people mover system at Los Angeles International Airport (LAX).

Geography
The city of Pittsburg is located 37 miles northeast from San Francisco, 29 miles northeast from Oakland, California, 60 miles north of San Jose and 65 miles south of Sacramento, California. Pittsburg shares a border with the unincorporated community of Bay Point, California to the west, the city of Concord, California to the southwest and Antioch, California to the east. The Suisun Bay is directly north of the city and connects the San Francisco Bay to the Sacramento and San Joaquin rivers.

Climate
Pittsburg experiences a hot summer Mediterranean climate (Köppen climate classification Csa) bordering on the Semi-arid climate because of the Mt. Diablo rain shadow in East Contra Costa County.

Transportation

The city has two BART stations, the Pittsburg/Bay Point Station located on Bailey Road and Highway 4 near Bay Point and the Pittsburg Center Station located on Railroad Avenue and Highway 4. Tri Delta Transit provides bus service in the area. California State Route 4 bisects the city from west to east.

Education

Pittsburg is home to Los Medanos College, a two-year community college that is part of the Contra Costa Community College District. The college's name is derived from that of Rancho Los Medanos, one of the land grants made by the Mexican Government during its sovereignty over California from 1821 to 1846; Los Medanos, loosely translated from Spanish, means The Sand Dunes. Construction on Los Medanos College was completed in 1974.

Pittsburg is served by three School Districts: Pittsburg Unified School District, Mt. Diablo Unified School District, and Antioch Unified School District.

Pittsburg has two public high schools, one a continuation school:
 Pittsburg High School
 Black Diamond High School

The public Junior high schools in Pittsburg are:
 Martin Luther King, Jr. Junior High School
 Hillview Junior High School
 Rancho Medanos Middle School

Central Jr. High School was another middle school in the Pittsburg area. But it closed down in 2008 due to a gas leak in the building. Currently, it remains vacant with no intention of reopening it.

The public elementary schools in Pittsburg are:
 Delta View Elementary School (Mt. Diablo Unified School District)
 Foothill Elementary School
 Heights Elementary School (torn down & renovated in 2014)
 Highlands Elementary School
 Los Medanos Elementary School
 Marina Vista Elementary School
 Parkside Elementary School (torn down & renovated in 2020)
 Stoneman Elementary School
 Willow Cove Elementary School
 Synergy Charter School (closed as of January 2016 due to financial struggles)

Private schools in Pittsburg include:
 The Christian Center
 School of Saint Peter Martyr
 Spectrum Center.

Public libraries
Pittsburg hosts one of the many Contra Costa County Libraries.

Arts and culture 

 California Theatre - opened on May 4, 1920, the California Theatre began as a venue for live vaudeville performances and silent films. The theatre was designed by architect Albert W. Cornelius in a classic revival style and built by the Enea Brothers for $200,000. During its heyday, notable performers included Flash Gordon and cowboy heroes Ray “Crash” Corrigan, Tim Holt, Tex Ritter and Fred Scott. The California Theatre closed in February 1954 and began to deteriorate, including the caving in of the ceiling due to rain damage. In 2008, the City began a major $7.6 million renovation, restoring artwork throughout the theatre and fabricating fixtures to match photographs of the original building. In 2022, the City completed an additional $2 million restoration to complete the balcony area. Today, the auditorium features a capacity of 981 seats, beaux-artes style ceiling decoration, and a grand balcony.

Redevelopment projects
 The city is currently in the process of redeveloping Old Town Pittsburg. In November 2010 The Railroad Book Depot opened. The bookstore is owned and operated by the non-profit Pittsburg Arts & Community Foundation.
 A new Marina Master Plan is under development along Pittsburg's waterfront which includes a pedestrian promenade with subsequent commercial construction and development planned.

Sports and recreation
The Pittsburg Delta View Golf Course had a back nine originally built in 1947, and a front nine completed in 1991. It closed in March 2018 due to financial difficulty and legal costs stemming from a slip and fall lawsuit. The city had considered keeping the course open, but after debate in May 2018, it was decided to use the land for other economic opportunities.

The Pittsburg Diamonds, an independent professional baseball team, began play as a member of the Pacific Association of Professional Baseball Clubs in 2014.  The team played its home games in City Park Field #1 until going on hiatus for 2019 and 2020. It remains to be seen if the team will resume play in 2021.

Demographics

2010
The 2010 United States Census reported that Pittsburg had a population of 63,264. The racial makeup of Pittsburg was 23,106 (36.5%) White, 11,187 (17.7%) African American, 517 (0.8%) Native American, 9,891 (15.6%) Asian (9.9% Filipino, 2.0% Indian, 1.2% Chinese, 1.1% Vietnamese, 0.2% Korean, 0.2% Japanese, 1.1% Other), 645 (1.0%) Pacific Islander, 13,270 (21.0%) from other races, and 4,648 (7.3%) from two or more races. Hispanic or Latino of any race were 26,841 persons (42.4%).

The Census reported that 62,973 people (99.5% of the population) lived in households, 153 (0.2%) lived in non-institutionalized group quarters, and 138 (0.2%) were institutionalized.

There were 19,527 households, out of which 8,837 (45.3%) had children under the age of 18 living in them, 9,833 (50.4%) were opposite-sex married couples living together, 3,583 (18.3%) had a female householder with no husband present, 1,420 (7.3%) had a male householder with no wife present.  There were 1,432 (7.3%) unmarried opposite-sex partnerships, and 194 (1.0%) same-sex married couples or partnerships. 3,446 households (17.6%) were made up of individuals, and 1,067 (5.5%) had someone living alone who was 65 years of age or older. The average household size was 3.22.  There were 14,836 families (76.0% of all households); the average family size was 3.64.

The population was spread out, with 17,385 people (27.5%) under the age of 18, 6,823 people (10.8%) aged 18 to 24, 18,319 people (29.0%) aged 25 to 44, 15,298 people (24.2%) aged 45 to 64, and 5,439 people (8.6%) who were 65 years of age or older.  The median age was 32.5 years. For every 100 females, there were 94.9 males.  For every 100 females age 18 and over, there were 92.4 males.

The homeowner vacancy rate was 3.8%; the rental vacancy rate was 6.8%.  37,078 people (58.6% of the population) lived in owner-occupied housing units and 25,895 people (40.9%) lived in rental housing units.

2000
As of the census of 2000, there were 56,769 people, 17,741 households, and 13,483 families residing in the city.  The population density was 3,639.0/mi2 (1,405.0/km2).  There were 18,300 housing units at an average density of 1,173.1/mi2 (452.9/km2).  The racial makeup of the city was 36.53% White, 25.89% Black or African American, 0.75% Native American, 12.65% Asian, 0.86% Pacific Islander, 16.11% from other races, and 7.22% from two or more races.  32.21% of the population were Hispanic or Latino of any race.

There were 17,741 households, out of which 42.2% had children under the age of 18 living with them, 52.5% were married couples living together, 17.2% had a female householder with no husband present, and 24.0% were non-families. 18.0% of all households were made up of individuals, and 5.8% had someone living alone who was 65 years of age or older.  The average household size was 3.17 and the average family size was 3.59.

In the city, the population was spread out, with 30.8% under the age of 18, 10.4% from 18 to 24, 31.2% from 25 to 44, 19.4% from 45 to 64, and 8.2% who were 65 years of age or older.  The median age was 31 years. For every 100 females, there were 96.6 males.  For every 100 females age 18 and over, there were 94.1 males.

The median income for a household in the city was $50,557, and the median income for a family was $54,472. Males had a median income of $39,111 versus $31,396 for females. The per capita income for the city was $18,241.  About 8.7% of families and 11.5% of the population were below the poverty line, including 14.1% of those under age 18 and 7.6% of those age 65 or over.

Politics

According to the California Secretary of State, as of February 10, 2019, Pittsburg has 33,751 registered voters. Of those, 18,644 (55.2%) are registered Democrats, 3,817 (11.3%) are registered Republicans, and 9,888 (29.3%) have declined to state a political party.

Notable people
People born in Pittsburg:
 Justin Baesman (born 1981), mixed martial artist
 Dante Basco (born 1975), actor
 Dion Basco (born 1977), actor; brother of Dante
 Toni Blackman, rapper
 Bert Bonanno (born 1940), track and field coach
 Marvin Burke (1918-1994), NASCAR driver
 Joe Canciamilla (born 1955), politician
 Cameron Colvin (born 1986), footballer
 John Coughran (born 1951), basketballer
 Xavier Crawford (born 1995), footballer
 Brian Dailey (born 1951), artist
 Darrell Daniels (born 1994), footballer
 Pete Escovedo (born 1935), percussionist
 Sal Esquivel (born 1948), businessman
 Rosie Gaines (born 1960), musician
 Phillip Garrido (born 1951), one of two kidnappers of Jaycee Dugard
 Donald George, operatic tenor
 Luis Gutierrez (born 1933), artist
 Shaunard Harts (born 1978), footballer
 Rydah J. Klyde, rapper
 Paul E. Koelliker (born 1943), general authority of LDS Church
 Steve Lopez (born 1953), journalist
 Pat McNeil (born 1954), footballer
 Aaron Miles (born 1976), baseballer
 Dominick Newton (1977-2015), rapper better known as "The Jacka"
 Joe O'Brien (born 1972), footballer
 James "Mighty Quinn" Page (born 1971), boxer
 Avery Patterson, footballer
 Broderick Perkins (born 1954), baseballer
 Evan Pilgrim (born 1972), footballer
 Ken Simonton (born 1979), footballer
 Dave Stetson (born 1946), co-creator of Caricature Carvers of America
 Joe Tafoya (born 1978), footballer
 Altie Taylor (1947-2010), footballer
 Tony Teresa (1933-1984), footballer
 Mario Verduzco, football coach
 Karen Vogtmann (born 1949), mathematician
 Keith Daniel Williams (1947-1996), murderer
 Stan Williamson (1909-1965), footballer

Sister cities
Pittsburg is twinned with:
  Isola delle Femmine, Italy
  Pohang, South Korea
  Shimonoseki, Japan
  Yahualica de González Gallo, Mexico

References

External links
 

 
 
 Pittsburg Chamber of Commerce

 
Cities in Contra Costa County, California
Cities in the San Francisco Bay Area
Populated places established in 1849
Incorporated cities and towns in California
1849 establishments in California